The 2008 Taça de Portugal Final was the final match of the 2007–08 Taça de Portugal, the 68th season of the Taça de Portugal, the premier Portuguese football cup competition organized by the Portuguese Football Federation (FPF). The match was played on 18 May 2008 at the Estádio Nacional in Oeiras, and opposed two Primeira Liga sides: Porto and Sporting CP. Sporting CP defeated Porto 2–0, thanks to two extra-time goals from Brazilian striker Rodrigo Tiuí which would give Sporting CP their fifteenth Taça de Portugal.

In Portugal, the final was televised live in HD on SIC and Sport TV. As Sporting CP claimed their fifteenth Taça de Portugal, they qualified for the 2008 Supertaça Cândido de Oliveira, where they took on the winners of the 2007–08 Primeira Liga, Porto at the Estádio Algarve.

Match

Details

References

2008
2007–08 in Portuguese football
FC Porto matches
Sporting CP matches